was a town located in Ninohe District, Iwate Prefecture, Japan.

The village of Jōbōji was created on April 1, 1889 within Ninohe District with the establishment of the municipality system. Jōbōji was raised to town status on December 25, 1940. On January 1, 2006, Jōbōji was merged into the expanded city of Ninohe. and no longer exists as an independent municipality.

As of January 2006, the town had an estimated population of 4,959 and a population density of 27.6 persons per km2. The total area was 179.70 km2.

External links
 Official website of Hachimantai 

Dissolved municipalities of Iwate Prefecture
Ninohe, Iwate